Tai Hang Sai Estate is a private housing estate in Shek Kip Mei, Kowloon, Hong Kong. It is located between Shek Kip Mei Estate and Tai Hang Tung Estate, near MTR Shek Kip Mei station. It consists of 8 residential buildings which were built in 1965 and 1977 respectively. Although it is rental housing, it was developed by a privately owned company, unlike other public housing estates which are built and managed by either Hong Kong Housing Authority or Hong Kong Housing Society.

History
In 1961, the British Hong Kong Government granted a piece of land at concessionary premium to the Hong Kong Settlers Housing Corporation Limited, founded in 1952 by Dr Lee Iu Cheung and others, to build and then manage the present Tai Hang Sai Estate in order to rehouse tenants affected by clearance of the then Tai Hang Sai Resettlement Area.

In 1965, the Corporation constructed seven buildings with a total of 1603 flats and let them out at rents below market levels to tenants on low incomes. This was the only instance in Hong Kong that Government granted land to a private company to build rental housing.

In 1977, just after the opening of Shek Kip Mei station, the eighth building, Man Tai House, was completed.

Demographics
According to the 2016 census, Tai Hang Sai Estate had a population of 2,639. The median age was 49.4 and the majority of residents (94.8 per cent) were of Chinese ethnicity. The average household size was 2.5 people. The median monthly household income of all households (i.e. including both economically active and inactive households) was HK$28,800.

Politics
Tai Hang Sai Estate is located in Nam Shan, Tai Hang Tung & Tai Hang Sai constituency of the Sham Shui Po District Council. It was formerly represented by Tam Kwok-kiu, who was elected in the 2019 elections until July 2021.

References

Public housing estates in Hong Kong
Private housing estates in Hong Kong
Residential buildings completed in 1965
Shek Kip Mei